Rejnuk (also Romanized as Rejnūk and Rajonūk) is a village in Qohestan Rural District, Qohestan District, Darmian County, South Khorasan Province, Iran. At the 2006 census, its population was 146, in 46 families.

References 

Populated places in Darmian County